The Other Side is the debut solo album by American rhythm and blues musician Gary Jenkins.  It was released through Anaphora Records in 2007.

Track listing
 "Interview"
 "The Other Side"
 "Friday Night"
 "Ev'rybody Dreams"
 "The Sound"
 "So Sexy"
 "Lovin' U"
 "Dance With Me"
 "Goes / Comes"
 "So Free"
 "Boojyghettoness"
 "The Door"
 "Moved On"
 "Change Gone Come"
 "One & Only"
 "U Keep On"

2007 debut albums